Now 03 is a compilation CD released under EMI Music Australia. It was released in early 2003 and contained a limited edition special bonus DVD. The album was certified gold.

Track listing
 Missy Elliott – "Work It" (4:22)
 Craig David – "Hidden Agenda" (3:33)
 Atomic Kitten – "Be with You" (Milky 7" Edit) (3:34)
 Robbie Williams – "Feel" (3:39)
 Stacie Orrico – "Stuck" (3:42)
 Disco Montego – "U Talkin' to Me" (3:50)
 Jeremy Gregory – "That's What's Going Down" (3:20)
 Justin Timberlake – "Like I Love You" (Basement Jaxx Mix) (6:02)
 The Living End – "One Said to the Other" (3:31)
 Liberty X vs. Richard X – "Being Nobody" (3:37)
 The Soundbluntz – "Billie Jean" (4:00)
 Jakatta featuring Seal – "My Vision" (Joey Negro 7" Club Mix) (3:44)
 Norah Jones – "Don't Know Why" (3:07)
 Snoop Dogg featuring Pharrell and Uncle Charlie Wilson – "Beautiful" (3:20)
 Coldplay – "Clocks" (4:11)
 Who Da Funk featuring Jessica Eve – "Shiny Disco Balls" (3:14)
 Jennifer Love Hewitt – "Can I Go Now" (3:34)
 DJ Sneak featuring Bear Who – "Fix My Sink" (3:23)
 Taxiride – "Afterglow" (4:07)

DVD
 Stacie Orrico – "Stuck"
 Disco Montego – "U Talkin' to Me"
 Jeremy Gregory – "That's What's Going Down"
 The Soundbluntz – "Billie Jean"
 Jakatta – "My Vision"
 Who Da Funk – "Shiny Disco Balls"
 Jennifer Love Hewitt – "Can I Go Now"
 DJ Sneak – "Fix My Sink"
 Taxiride – "Afterglow"

References

2003 compilation albums
EMI Records compilation albums
Now That's What I Call Music! albums (Australian series)